Kevin Lamont Hardy (born July 24, 1973) is a former American football linebacker in the National Football League (NFL) for the Jacksonville Jaguars, Dallas Cowboys, and Cincinnati Bengals. He played college football at the University of Illinois.

Early years
Hardy attended William Henry Harrison High School, where he received numerous awards and accolades as a high school football player. 

As a senior, he posted 127 tackles (47 solo), 2 interceptions, 32 receptions for 610 yards and 13 touchdowns, 55 carries for 410 yards, returned 6 punts for 42 yards and 15 kickoffs for 344 yards. He received All-Evansville, City Player of the Year, All-Southern Indiana and Conference and Region Player of the Year honors. 

He also was a cum laude honor roll student, competed in basketball and ran track. His teammates included future NBA players Calbert Cheaney, Walter McCarty and also future college coach Chris Lowery.

College career
Hardy accepted a football scholarship from the University of Illinois at Urbana–Champaign. As a redshirt freshman, he had 67 tackles (third on the team), 4 sacks and 7 tackles for loss.

As a sophomore, he started all 11 games at "drop" linebacker. He totaled 78 tackles (fourth on the team), 2 sacks, 8 tackles for loss, 2 passes defensed and one forced fumble.

As a junior, he registered 80 tackles (8 for loss), one sack, 2 interceptions and one pass defensed. During his time at Illinois, the Fighting Illini had a number of outstanding linebackers. In the 1994 season, the four linebackers in coach Lou Tepper's 3–4 defense were Hardy, fellow Butkus Award winner Dana Howard, Simeon Rice and John Holecek. Because of this, Hardy was often overlooked, as he was not prolific in accumulating tackles like Howard, or in quarterback sacks as was Rice, who as a "rush linebacker" played on the line of scrimmage like a defensive end. 

As a senior, he was recognized as being among the very best linebackers in college football, winning the Dick Butkus Award and receiving consensus first-team All-American honors. He started every game at "drop" linebacker, finishing with 105 tackles (second on the team), 11 sacks, 15 tackles for loss, 5 forced fumbles, 3 interceptions (tied for the team lead) and 3 passes defensed. He had 18 tackles (13 solo) against Michigan State University. He made 3 sacks against Indiana University.

Hardy finished his career ranked ninth on the Illinois All-time list with 330 tackles, fourth in sacks with 18, and fourth in tackles for loss with 38. He was a business major and was initiated as a member of Omega Psi Phi fraternity.

Professional football

Jacksonville Jaguars
Hardy was selected by the Jacksonville Jaguars with the second overall choice in the 1996 NFL Draft, signing a six-year $14.8 million contract with a six million dollar signing bonus. Hardy's fellow linebacker at Illinois, Rice, was selected with the third overall choice. 

Hardy became the first defensive rookie in franchise history to start on opening day, going on to start 15 games at strongside linebacker. He recorded 130 tackles (second on the team), 5.5 sacks (third in the NFL among rookies), 7 quarterback hurries, 2 interceptions (tied for the team lead), 7 passes defensed, 2 forced fumbles, one fumble recovery and was named to the NFL All-Rookie team.

In 1997, he was limited with injuries, starting 11 out of 13 games at strongside linebacker. He tallied 73 tackles (3 for loss), 2.5 sacks, 5 quarterback hurries and one pass defensed. He suffered a sprained left medial collateral ligament against the Dallas Cowboys, missing 3 contests and seeing limited action in several games the remainder of the season because of the injury. He was able to start the wild card playoff game against the Denver Broncos, collecting 8 tackles.

In 1998, with the signing of free agent Bryce Paup, he was moved to weakside linebacker and started all 16 games. He had a franchise record 186 tackles, while also making 1.5 sacks, 10 quarterback hurries, 2 interceptions, 7 passes defensed, 2 forced fumbles and one fumble recovery. He set a franchise record (for postseason or regular season) with 23 tackles in the Divisional playoff game against the New York Jets, while also having a sack and a forced fumble.

In 1999, Hardy led all AFC linebackers with 10.5 sacks and led the team with 153 tackles. He also had 7 tackles for loss, 24 quarterback hurries, 2 forced fumbles and one fumble recovery, helping the Jaguars achieve a 14-win season. He was named to the AP All-Pro first-team. He joined Carnell Lake ad Tony Brackens as the first Jaguars defensive players named to the Pro Bowl. He had 16 tackles against the Cleveland Browns. He made 13 tackles, 4 quarterback hurries and one forced fumble against the Cincinnati Bengals.

In 2000, he registered 149 tackles (led the team), 3 sacks, 16 quarterback pressures, 6 tackles for loss, one interception, 16 passes defensed, 2 forced fumbles and 2 fumble recoveries. He had 11 tackles and one sack against the New York Giants.

In 2001, he was moved back to strongside linebacker, but injured his knee in the ninth game of the season. At the time he had 98 tackles (second on the team), 5 1/2 sacks (tied for third on the team), 9 quarterback pressures, 4 passes defensed and one fumble recovery. It would be his last game with the Jaguars, who eventually moved him to the injured reserve list, due to needing a microfracture surgery which was thought to be career threatening, because in those days not many players fully recovered from this medical procedure. He left as the franchise's All-time tackles leader, after playing six seasons, which included four trips to the NFL playoffs.

Dallas Cowboys
On April 14, 2002, the Dallas Cowboys gambled that he could return from the complex surgery and signed him as an unrestricted free agent, counting $2.5 million in his first year and structuring the rest of the $23 million contract with a $5.025 million option in the second year.

Hardy recovered from his injury and played for the Cowboys in the 2002 NFL season, finishing the season ranked third on the team in both total (114) and solo tackles (73), while making 2 sacks, 18 quarterback pressures, 8 tackles for loss, 10 passes defensed and 3 forced fumbles. He played outside linebacker, lining up as a defensive end in some passing downs. Because of salary cap issues, he was released on February 27, 2003, in order to avoid a $5.025 million option bonus.

Cincinnati Bengals
On March 6, 2003, he signed a four-year, $14 million contract with the Cincinnati Bengals as an unrestricted free agent, to be the Bengals new middle linebacker, after playing outside linebacker in his previous seasons. Hardy was an integral part of the Bengals' defense, starting all 16 games, leading the team in defensive snaps played (1,030 of 1,038 for 99.2%) and was second on the team in tackles (91). 

In 2004, he was moved to strongside linebacker after the signing of free agent Nate Webster, starting 14 games and making 84 tackles. The Bengals terminated Hardy's contract in a salary-cap move on May 3, 2005.

Hardy finished his career with 742 tackles (563 solo), 36 sacks, 43.5 tackles for loss, 11 forced fumbles, seven fumble recoveries, 45 pass deflections, five interceptions for 59 yards, and one touchdown in 134 games.

NFL statistics

Regular season

Postseason

Personal life
Hardy currently resides in Jacksonville, Florida. In August 2007, he built his South Beach club venture, Dream Nightclub, centered around a motto that "reality is overrated." "I've been around and entertained people all my life, so I made a business out of it" said Hardy.  In 2019, Hardy listed his 7 bedroom, 8.5 bath, 10,000 square foot Jacksonville mansion for sale at a price of $3,175,000.

References

External links
 ESPN.com player card
 

1973 births
Living people
Sportspeople from Evansville, Indiana
Players of American football from Indiana
All-American college football players
American Conference Pro Bowl players
American football linebackers
Illinois Fighting Illini football players
Jacksonville Jaguars players
Dallas Cowboys players
Cincinnati Bengals players